Brusen Point (‘Nos Brusen’ \'nos 'bru-sen\) is the narrow rocky point projecting 200 m in north-northwest direction and forming the north extremity of Greenwich Island in the South Shetland Islands, Antarctica. Nereid Lake is situated 800 m east-southeast of the point, and Proteus Lake lies at its base.

The point is named after the settlements of Brusen in Northwestern and Western Bulgaria.

Location
British mapping in 1968, Chilean in 1971, Argentine in 1980, and Bulgarian in 2005 and 2009.

Maps
 L.L. Ivanov et al. Antarctica: Livingston Island and Greenwich Island, South Shetland Islands. Scale 1:100000 topographic map. Sofia: Antarctic Place-names Commission of Bulgaria, 2005.
 L.L. Ivanov. Antarctica: Livingston Island and Greenwich, Robert, Snow and Smith Islands. Scale 1:120000 topographic map.  Troyan: Manfred Wörner Foundation, 2009.   (Updated second edition 2010.  )

References
 Brusen Point. SCAR Composite Antarctic Gazetteer
 Bulgarian Antarctic Gazetteer. Antarctic Place-names Commission. (details in Bulgarian, basic data in English)

External links
 Brusen Point. Copernix satellite image

Headlands of Greenwich Island
Bulgaria and the Antarctic